Neohelvibotys saltensis is a moth in the family Crambidae described by Hahn William Capps in 1967. It is found in Salta Province, Argentina.

The wingspan is about 23 mm.

References

Moths described in 1967
Pyraustinae